KKIQ (101.7 FM) is a commercial adult contemporary radio station located in Pleasanton, California, broadcasting to the East Bay area with a main focus on Southern Alameda County. Their slogan is "Your Hometown Station!".

KKIQ is owned by Alpha Media, which acquired the station in 2015 and also owns KKDV 92.1 FM in Walnut Creek and KUIC 95.3 FM in Vacaville. Both KKIQ and KKDV operate from studios located in Pleasanton near Stoneridge Mall, and KKIQ has a transmitter site southeast of Livermore. It also utilizes two boosters to boost coverage: one in Hayward and one in Tracy.

References

External links
Official Website

KIQ
Mainstream adult contemporary radio stations in the United States
Radio stations established in 1969
1969 establishments in California
Alpha Media radio stations